Bholaa is an upcoming Indian Hindi-language action thriller film directed by Ajay Devgn and produced by Ajay Devgn FFilms, Reliance Entertainment, T-Series Films and Dream Warrior Pictures. Adaptation of the 2019 Tamil film Kaithi. The film stars Devgn in the titular role alongside, Tabu, Deepak Dobriyal, Sanjay Mishra and Gajraj Rao in pivotal roles. Amala Paul and Abhishek Bachchan make special appearances. In the film, After ten years of imprisonment, Bholaa is finally going home to meet his young daughter. However, his journey is not so simple as he soon faces a pathway full of crazy obstacles, with death lurking around every corner.

Principal photography took place from January 2022 to January 2023 in Mumbai, Hyderabad and Varanasi. The film score and soundtrack album are composed by Ravi Basrur. It is scheduled to be released theatrically on 30 March 2023.

Premise
Inspector Diana Joseph and her team confiscate a massive amount of cocaine and arrest some of the members of the syndicate, including the head of the syndicate "Sika Gang", Nithari, whose identity they do not know of. This enrages Nithari's brother, Ashwathama 'Ashu', who declares a bounty against the 5 cops and to retrieve the consignment. He also poisons the food and drinks of the cops at the retirement party of Diana's superior, thanks to information provided by the corrupt NCB cop, Devraj Subramaniam. Diana, who avoided the food and drinks, as she was under medication, convinces Bholaa, a recently released prisoner, to drive the cops to the nearest hospital, 80 kilometers away, in exchange of meeting his daughter, Jyothi. Bholaa reluctantly agrees and a race against time begins to save the cops, whilst dealing Ashu and his gang.

Cast
Ajay Devgn as Bholaa
Tabu as Diana Joseph IPS
Sanjay Mishra as Inspector
Deepak Dobriyal as Ashwathama 'Ashu', Nithari's younger brother
Gajraj Rao as Devraj Subramaniam
Vineet Kumar as Nithari, Ashu's elder brother
Makarand Deshpande
Yuri Suri
Ketan Karande
Arpit Ranka
Kiran Kumar
Lokesh Mittal as a police officer
Hirva Trivedi as Jyoti, Bholaa's daughter
Amala Paul as Bholaa's wife (special appearance)
Raai Laxmi as a bar dancer in the song "Paan Dukaniya"
Abhishek Bachchan (cameo appearance)

Production

Filming
Principal photography for the film commenced on 13 January 2022.  Filming took place in Hyderabad, Madh Island, Kharghar, Mumbai and Varanasi. Tabu's character is a gender-swapped version of Narain's character from Kaithi. The entire filming for Bholaa was wrapped up on 6 January 2023.

Music
The music of the film is composed by Ravi Basrur while lyrics are written by Irshad Kamil. The first single titled "Nazar Lag Jayegi" was released on 20 February 2023. The second single titled "Aadha Main Aadhi Vo" was released on 15 March 2023. The third single titled "Paan Dukaniya" was released on 20 March 2023.

Release

Bholaa is scheduled to be theatrically released in India on 30 March 2023 in 2D, 3D and IMAX 3D.

References

External links
 
 

Indian action films
2020s Indian films
2020s Hindi-language films
2023 films
Upcoming films
Hindi remakes of Tamil films
Indian 3D films
IMAX films
Upcoming IMAX films
2023 3D films